The Switzerland national under-16 basketball team is the national junior representative for Switzerland in international under-16 and under-17 basketball competitions. They are governed by Swiss Basketball. 

The team competes at the FIBA U16 European Championship, mostly in Division B.

Toni Rocak who later played in the US-based NCAA and also became a member of Switzerland's senior team is a notable former member.

See also
Switzerland men's national basketball team
Switzerland men's national under-18 basketball team
Switzerland women's national under-16 basketball team

References

External links
Official website 
FIBA profile

Basketball in Switzerland
Basketball teams in Switzerland
Men's national under-16 basketball teams
Basketball